Kamil Ali Abbas oglu Khanlarov (1915 – 1996) was a Soviet-Azerbaijani painter. He had received the honorary titles of the Honored Artist of the Azerbaijani SSR in 1964, and the People's Artist of Azerbaijan in 1992.

Early life 
Kamil Khanlarov was born on 9 March 1915, in Baku, then part of the Russian Empire. He entered Azerbaijan State Art College in 1931 and graduated in 1935. Among his teachers was Salam Salamzadeh. At that time, the outbreak of World War II limited the Khanlarov's access to higher education.

Career 
Khanlarov's debut work was Meeting in the Village, which had a historical theme and was presented during an exhibition in 1932,  Khanlarov mostly focused on historical themes, as well as portraits before and during the World War II. Examples of his works in historical themes include Meeting in the Village (1932), Mazdak Before Execution (1941), The Peasant Uprising in Tovuz (1940), Javanshir in the Battle Against the Invaders (1982), Reception of the Russian envoy by Fatali Khan, Meshadi Azizbekov Among the Peasants, and among his portraits are Aqa Mirak, Sultan Mohammed, Qatran Tabrizi, Nizami Ganjavi, Javanshir, Imadaddin Nasimi and others.

His later works were mostly in the genre of landscape. Lyrical emotionality and color mastery occupied an important place in Khanlarov's works. He has worked in many regions of Azerbaijan, painting the nature of Nakhchivan, Ordubad, Julfa, Sharur, Karabakh, Shusha, Zagatala, and Astara. Examples of such works by Khanlarov are The Mountains of Zagatala (1946), Astara (1955), Talysh Mountains (1956), The Outskirts of Shusha (1957), Shusha (1964), Evening in Bilgah (1964), On the Shores of Araz (1965), Norashen Valley (1968), On the Southern Border (1972), The View of Murovdag (1972), On the Shores of Julfa Araz (1973), The Scenery of Shusha (1983), The Jeyranbatan Lake (1987). Khanlarov also went on a creative trip to Czechoslovakia in 1961. His paintings dedicated to Czechoslovakia include A Street in Prague, A Square in Karlovy Vary, A Golden Street, A Tower in Prague, and A Monument to Jan Gus.

Kamil Khanlarov's works were exhibited in Austria, Hungary, Romania, Germany, Egypt, Iraq, Canada, Syria, Norway, France, Finland, Japan, Iran, Afghanistan, Turkey and Poland. His works are kept in several museums, galleries and private collections in Azerbaijan.

Kamil Khanlarov also worked as a teacher at the Azerbaijan State Art College from 1938 to 1985. He taught modern Azerbaijani artists such as Tahir Salahov, Togrul Narimanbekov, Elmira Shahtakhtinskaya, Tofig Agababayev, Rasim Babayev, Hafiz Mammadov and Ali Verdiyev. In 1939, Khanlarov became a member of the Union of Artists of the Azerbaijani SSR.  He was awarded the honorary titles of Honored Artist of the Azerbaijan SSR in 1964, and People's Artist in 1992.

Death 
Kamil Khanlarov died in 1996, in Baku, the capital of Azerbaijan.

References 

1915 births
Artists from Baku
1996 deaths
20th-century Azerbaijani painters
Soviet painters
Burials at II Alley of Honor
Honored Artists of the Azerbaijan SSR